Glass Houses is a 2006 young adult urban fantasy/vampire novel by Rachel Caine. It has been on the New York Times best selling list.

Plot summary
The first in the award winning series, Glass Houses is about college freshman, Claire Danvers who has had enough of her nightmarish dorm situation. When Claire heads off-campus, the imposing old house where she finds a room may not be much better. Her new roommates don't show many signs of life, but they will have Claire's back when the town's deepest secrets come crawling out, hungry for fresh blood. Will she be able to face the town's terror or will she drown like everyone else?

Online show
The whole Morganville Vampires series was turned into an online web series in 2013. That has won the Comicpalooza official selection in 2015 along with Raindance webfest official selection of 2015.

References

External links

Web series website

2006 American novels
2006 fantasy novels
Urban fantasy novels
American vampire novels
New American Library books